Shakhov is a surname. Notable persons with that name include:

 Mikhail Shakhov (born 1931), Ukrainian wrestler 
 Vitali Shakhov (born 1991), Russian footballer
 Yevhen Shakhov (disambiguation), multiple persons
Yevhen Shakhov (footballer born 1962), Soviet-Ukrainian football player and coach
Yevhen Shakhov (footballer born 1990), Ukrainian footballer, son of the above

Russian-language surnames